Kenora may refer to:

 City of Kenora, Ontario, Canada
 Kenora (electoral district), federal and provincial electoral districts in Ontario
 Kenora District, a territorial district in Ontario

See also
 Canora (disambiguation)